Pubbaka is a funny character appearing in Pali and Sinhala folk tales and in some Buddhist tales.

Pubbaka is given as an example as a stingy person who loses everything for money.

See also:
Mahadanamutta
Buddhist folklore
Sri Lankan folklore